Activist Wisdom: Practical knowledge and Creative Tension in Social Movements is a book by Sarah Maddison and Sean Scalmer. UNSW Press, 2005. 

Peace marches, protest demonstrations and campaigns have often been part of the Australian social and political landscape. This book includes interviews with some of Australia's best-known activists and provides a bigger picture that analyses successes and failures, communication of ideas, and political impacts.

See also
Activism
Silencing Dissent: How the Australian Government Is Controlling Public Opinion and Stifling Debate

References

External links
Why Civil Resistance Works: The Strategic Logic of Nonviolent Conflict

2005 non-fiction books
Books about activism
Australian non-fiction books
Protests in Australia